Bennett's laws of quantum information are:
 1 qubit  1 bit (classical),
 1 qubit  1 ebit (entanglement bit),
 1 ebit + 1 qubit  2 bits (i.e. superdense coding),
 1 ebit + 2 bits  1 qubit (i.e. quantum teleportation),

where  indicates "can do the job of".

These principles were formulated around 1993 by Charles H. Bennett.

References 
 Quantum Mechanics: The Physics of the Microscopic World, Benjamin Schumacher, The Teaching Company, lecture 21

Quantum information theory